The High Sheriff of Carlow was the British Crown's judicial representative in County Carlow, Ireland from the 14th century until 1922, when the office was abolished in the new Free State and replaced by the office of Carlow County Sheriff. The sheriff had judicial, electoral, ceremonial and administrative functions and executed High Court Writs. In 1908, an Order in Council made the Lord-Lieutenant the Sovereign's prime representative in a county and reduced the High Sheriff's precedence. However, the sheriff retained his responsibilities for the preservation of law and order in the county. The usual procedure for appointing the sheriff from 1660 onwards was that three persons were nominated at the beginning of each year from the county and the Lord Lieutenant then appointed his choice as High Sheriff for the remainder of the year. Often the other nominees were appointed as under-sheriffs. Sometimes a sheriff did not fulfil his entire term through death or other event and another sheriff was then appointed for the remainder of the year. The dates given hereunder are the dates of appointment. All addresses are in County Carlow unless stated otherwise.

High Sheriffs of County Carlow
1356: William  Vale
1358: William  Valle, again 
1374: Geoffrey Vale
1405: Richard fitz Esmond Butler
1414: Thomas Vale 
1583: George Carew, 1st Earl of Totnes
1612: Sir Thomas Butler, 1st Baronet of Cloughgrenan
1619: Nicholas Harman of Carlow
1622: Sir Thomas Butler, 1st Baronet of Cloughgrenan
1641: Edward Butler
1650: Henry Prittie
1662: Thomas Burdett of Dunmore
1670: Sir Thomas Butler, 3rd Baronet
1686: William Brereton
1689: Mark Baggot (Jacobite)
1691: Sir Thomas Butler, 3rd Baronet
1694: Edmond Jones 
1695: Benjamin Bunbury of Killerig
1700: Urban Vigors
1701: Sir Thomas Burdett, 1st Baronet of Garryhill
1706: George Brereton
1707: Digby Berkeley 
1708: Thomas Bernard of Oldtown and Clonmulsh
1712: Michael Warren 
1713: Benjamin Bunbury 
1714: Richard Vigors
1715: Henry Percy  
1716: Charles Nuttall 
1717: Wentworth Harman 
1718: Charles Bernard of Bernard's Grove
1719: Jeffrey Paul 
1721: Richard Wolseley 
1722: William Pendred 
1724: Samuel Burton of Burton Hall, Carlow
1725: Richard Wolseley
1730: Joseph Bernard of Straw Hill
1730: Robert Burton
1733: Denny Cuffe
1736: Benjamin Burton of Burton Hall, Carlow
1737: William Brereton
1743: I. Thomas Trench
1744: Jacob Peppard Warren
1751: George Brereton
1754: Ralph Howard, 1st Viscount Wicklow
1760: Benjamin Burton of Burton hall, Carlow

George III, 1760–1820
1761: Thomas Bunbury
1762:
1766: John Vigors of Old Leighlin
1767: Vesey Colclough
1768:
1769: William Bunbury
1770: Clement Wolseley
1771: Thomas Whelan
1772:
1773: John Perkins
1775: Benjamin Burton Doyne
1776: James Garrett of Janeville
1777: George Bunbury of Rathmore
1782: Richard Mercer, of Lodge
1783: William Vicars, of Ballinakill
1784: Sir Richard Butler, 7th Baronet of Garyhunden
1785: Henry Bruen of Sportland
1787: Robert Cornwall
1788:
1789: Harry Bunbury Lodge
1790:
1794: John Drought
1794: William Browne
1795: John Maxwell Barry of Newtownbarry
1797: John Newton
1800: Edward Eustace of Castlemore
1802: John Bennett
1804: Henry Colclough
1805: David Latouche of Upton
1806: William Garrett of Janeville
1807: Robert Anthony Latouche, jnr
1808: Robert Marshall
1809: John Cornwall
1810: Benjamin Disraeli of Bettyville House, Carlow (uncle of British PM)
1811: William Knott
1812: Gilbert Pickering Rudkin of Wells
1813: James Eustace of Castlemore
1814: Beauchamp Colclough and Henry Colclough
1815: Henry Guy Colclough
1816: Benjamin Burton
1817: John Faulkner Cornwall
1818: Sir Thomas Butler, 8th Baronet
1819: John Dawson Duckett of Duckett's Grove

George IV, 1820–1830

1820: Sir Charles Burton, 3rd Baronet
1821: William Richard Stewart
1822: William Fitzwilliam Burton of Burton Hall
1823: John Staunton Rochfort
1824: John Alexander, jnr. of Milford,
1825: William Duckett
1827: W.Newton
1828: John James Lecky of Ballykealey

William IV, 1830–1837
1831: Robert Clayton Browne of Browne's Hill
1833: Horace Rochfort
1834: John Watson of Ballydarton
1834: Philip Bagnall of Drumleckney
1835: James Hardy Eustace of Hardymount and Castlemore
1836: Sir Richard Pierce Butler, 9th Baronet
1837: George R. Keogh

Victoria, 1837–1901
1838: John George Brabazon Ponsonby, 5th Earl of Bessborough
1839:
1840: Horace William Noel Rochfort, of Clogrenane
1841:
1842: Hon. Somerset Richard Maxwell of Mountnugent
1843: Thomas Tench Vigors of Erindale
1844: Sir Robert Joshua Paul, 3rd Baronet of Paulville, Ballyglan
1845: Robert Stephen Doyne
1846: Philip Jocelyn Newton
1847: Hugh Faulkner
1848: Samuel Elliott of Racrogue
1849: William Fitzwilliam Burton
1850: Beauchamp Bartholomew Newton
1851: Charles William Cuffe Burton, 5th Baronet
1852: Sir Clement Wolseley, 5th Baronet of Mount Wolseley
1853: John Beauchamp Brady of Myshall House
1854: William Duckett of Duckett's Grove
1855: Rt Hon Henry Bruen
1856: John Newton
1857: Arthur MacMorrough Kavanagh, The MacMorrough
1858: Denis William Pack-Beresford of Fenagh Lodge, Bagnalstown
1859: William Clayton Browne-Clayton
1860: John Lecky Watson of Kiloonnor, Fenagh 
1861: Sir John Richard Wolseley, 6th Baronet, of Castletown
1862: Hardy Eustace of Castlemore and Hardymount
1863:
1864: John Frederic Lecky of Ballykealey.
1865: Captain William Bunbury M'Clintock Bunbury of Rathvilly, Baltinglass.
1866: Sir Thomas Pierce Butler, 10th Baronet of Ballintemple, Tullow.
1867: Maurice James Eustace of Newstown.
1868: Robert Westley Hall-Dare of Newtonbarry.
1869: Philip Charles Newton.
1870: John Cornwall Brady of Myshall.
1871: Beauchamp Frederick Bagenal of Benekerry House.
1873: Steuart James Charles Duckett of Russelltown.
1874: James Eustace of Newstown.
1875: Charles Mervyn Doyne.
1875: Peter George FitzGerald, 1st Baronet.
1876: Thomas Kane McClintock-Bunbury, 2nd Baron Rathdonnell
1878: James Walter Milles Stopford, 6th Earl of Courtown.
1879: Charles Edward Henry Duckett-Steuart of Rutland Lodge.
1880: John William McClintock-Bunbury.
1881:
1882: Robert Abraham Brewster French-Brewster of Cloonanartmore.
1884: Walter MacMurrough Kavanagh of Borris.
1885:
1886: Henry Bruen.
1887: Ambrose More-O'Ferrall of Balyna, Co. Kildare.
1888: Sir Maurice Fitzgerald, 20th Knight of Kerry.
1890: Denis Robert Pack-Beresford of Fenagh House.
1891: John Alexander of Milford House.
1892:
1893: Charles John Engledow.
1894: Philip Doyne of Holloden.
1895: John James Hardy Rowland Eustace-Duckett of Castlemore and Hardymount.
1896: Robert Westley Hall-Dare
1897: William Peisley Hutchinson Lloyd-Vaughan.
1898: Edward Ponsonby, 8th Earl of Bessborough.
1899: Thomas Herbert Robertson.
1900: John Bonham of Ballintaggart.

Edward VII, 1901–1910
1901: Godwin Butler Meade Swifte of Swiftsheath and Foulksrath Castle and Lionsden
1902: Dermot Henry Doyne
1903: Louis Perrin-Hatchell of Fortfield House
1904: Henry Philip Newton of Mount Leinster
1905: Sir Richard Pierce Butler, 11th Baronet
1906: Stanley Edward Denyer of Pollacton 
1907: Lt-Col. Robert Clayton Browne-Clayton, D.S.O., of Browne's Hill 
1909: Thomas Leopold McClintock-Bunbury, 3rd Baron Rathdonnell
1910: William Fitzwilliam Burton

George V 1910–1936
1911: Walter Henry Mountiford Westropp-Dawson
1920: Charles Richard Butler

References

 
Carlow
History of County Carlow